The 2016 TCR International Series Spa-Francorchamps round was the third round of the 2016 TCR International Series season. It took place on 6–7 May at the Circuit de Spa-Francorchamps.

Aku Pellinen won the first race, starting from third position, driving a Honda Civic TCR, and Jean-Karl Vernay gained the second one, driving a Volkswagen Golf GTI TCR.

Ballast
Due to the results obtained in the previous round, Gianni Morbidelli received +30 kg, Stefano Comini +20 kg and James Nash +10 kg.

Classification

Qualifying

Notes
 — Dušan Borković, Aku Pellinen and Grégory Guilvert's best lap time in Q1 were deleted for exceeding track limits.
 — Maťo Homola and Jean-Karl Vernay's best lap time in Q2 were deleted for exceeding track limits.
 — Jean-Karl Vernay and Mikhail Grachev's best lap time in Q1 were deleted for exceeding track limits repeatedly.

Race 1

Notes
 — Mikhail Grachev was given a three-place grid penalty for exceeding track limits repeatedly during the Qualifying session.
 — Jean-Karl Vernay was given a 30-second penalty for causing a collision with James Nash.

Race 2

Standings after the event

Drivers' Championship standings

Model of the Year standings

Teams' Championship standings

 Note: Only the top five positions are included for both sets of drivers' standings.

References

External links
TCR International Series official website

Spa-Francorchamps
TCR International Series
TCR